The first Camden Bullets were an American basketball team based in Camden, New Jersey that was a member of the Eastern Professional Basketball League.  The franchise was originally known as the Baltimore Bullets, where they had won the 1961 EPBL championship.

The franchise received a major boost when Paul Arizin, a member of the NBA's Philadelphia Warriors, chose to stay in Pennsylvania rather than move with the franchise to San Francisco.  Still wanting to play basketball, Arizin suited up for the Camden Bullets, and helped the team become league champions in 1964.

After a disappointing 1965-66 season, the Bullets were sold and relocated to Hartford, Connecticut as the Hartford Capitols.

Year-by-year

EBA
The second Camden Bullets were an American basketball team based in Camden, New Jersey that was a member of the Eastern Basketball Association.  The franchise played in the 1970-71 season and made the playoffs, with Ben Warley as their main star.  The franchise moved for the 1971-72 season to Cherry Hill, New Jersey and became the Cherry Hill Demons.

Year-by-year

Continental Basketball Association teams
Defunct basketball teams in the United States
Basketball teams in New Jersey
Sports in Camden, New Jersey
Cherry Hill, New Jersey
Defunct sports teams in New Jersey